Baiji may refer to:

 Baiji, the Yangtze River dolphin (Lipotes vexillifer)
 Baiji, Iraq, a city
 Baiji District, Iraq
 Baiji Township, Xiuning County, Anhui, China
 Baiji Township, Nanning, in Yongning District, Nanning, Guangxi, China
 An ancient kingdom in the southern Korean peninsula, called Baekje in Korean

See also
 Bahjí
 Baijiu